Tunchang County is a county of Hainan Province, People's Republic of China. Its postal code is 571600, and in 1999 its population was 250,059 people. The administrative seat lies at Tuncheng.

There are four main attractions in this county: The Muse Lake, The Standard Model Deer Farm, Shi Xia Hairui Ancestral Home and the Wolong Mountain.

In 1983, a company from Guangxi moved to Tunchang and started raising geoemydid turtles on a farm. They have since moved to a place near Sanya, which is closer to the ocean.

Climate

See also
 List of administrative divisions of Hainan

References

 
 Official website (Chinese)

External links
 

Tunchang County